Congleton is a parliamentary constituency in Cheshire, represented in the House of Commons of the UK Parliament since 2010 by Fiona Bruce of the Conservative Party.

Constituency profile
The constituency adjoins the Stoke-on-Trent urban area and rural areas in all other directions, including the Peak District to the East, Staffordshire Moorlands to the South and Cheshire Plain to the West.

Congleton is a stronghold for the Conservative Party as the seat has elected a Conservative MP since its creation in 1983, with a majority of 32% in the 2019 general election.

The constituency consists mainly of rural areas of south-east Cheshire, with the only four towns being - in descending order of population - Congleton, Sandbach, Middlewich and Alsager. The seat is also home to the large village of Holmes Chapel, as well as many much smaller villages and settlements, such as Church Lawton, Rode Heath and Goostrey.

It has been proposed by the boundary commission that Holmes Chapel should be moved to the Tatton constituency as part of the 2023 Boundary review.

Creation 
The constituency was created for the 1983 general election following the major reorganisation of local authorities under the Local Government Act 1972, which came into effect on 1 April 1974. It comprises parts of Macclesfield and the abolished constituencies of Crewe, Knutsford and Nantwich.

Boundaries 

1983–1997: The Borough of Congleton, and the Borough of Crewe and Nantwich ward of Haslington.

The town of Congleton was previously in the constituency of Macclesfield; Alsager, Sandbach and Haslington, came from Crewe; Middlewich from Nantwich; and rural areas comprising the former Rural District of Congleton were previously part of Knutsford.

1997–2010: The Borough of Congleton.

Haslington was transferred to Crewe and Nantwich.

The Parliamentary Constituencies (England) Order 2007 made no changes to Congleton. However, before this came into force for the 2010 election, the Borough of Congleton was abolished on 1 April 2009, becoming part of the new unitary authority of Cheshire East. Consequently, the constituency's boundaries are currently:

2010–present: The Cheshire East Borough wards of Alsager, Brereton Rural (part), Congleton East, Congleton West, Dane Valley, Middlewich, Odd Rode, Sandbach Elworth, Sandbach Ettiley Heath and Wheelock, Sandbach Heath and East, and Sandbach Town.

Political history 
Congleton is a stronghold for the Conservative Party as the seat has elected a Conservative MP since its creation in 1983, with a majority of 32% in the 2019 UK General Election. 

The seat was held comfortably from 1983 until 2010 by the Conservative Ann Winterton, the wife of Sir Nicholas Winterton, the MP for the adjacent Macclesfield constituency. Both stood down at the 2010 general election; their joint statement cited the hectic life of politics as part of their reason for standing down, in addition to an investigation by the Parliamentary Commissioner for Standards, who concluded that they misused their MPs' expenses to pay rent for a flat that they had already bought outright.

Mrs Winterton was succeeded by Fiona Bruce at the 2010 general election and she has held the seat since then.

Members of Parliament

Elections

Elections in the 2010s

Elections in the 2000s

Elections in the 1990s

Elections in the 1980s

See also 

 List of parliamentary constituencies in Cheshire
History of parliamentary constituencies and boundaries in Cheshire

Notes

References

Parliamentary constituencies in Cheshire
Constituencies of the Parliament of the United Kingdom established in 1983
Congleton